Péter Benkő (born 1947) is a Hungarian actor, son of actor Gyula Benkő.

Selected filmography
 The Testament of Aga Koppanyi (1967)
 Stars of Eger (1968)
 Temperate Zone (1970)
 Csínom Palkó (1973)
 Tüzgömbök (1975)
 The Fortress (1979)
 The Pagan Madonna (1980)
 Lutra (1986)

Bibliography
 Burns, Bryan. World Cinema: Hungary. Fairleigh Dickinson University Press, 1996.

External links

1947 births
Living people
Hungarian male film actors
Hungarian male television actors
Male actors from Budapest
20th-century Hungarian male actors
21st-century Hungarian male actors